Klarvatten is a residential neighbourhood in north Edmonton, Alberta, Canada.  Its location gives residents good access to CFB Edmonton.

It is bounded on the south by 167 Avenue, on the east by 82 Street, and on the west by 91 Street.  To the north is undeveloped rural land located within the city limits.

Development of the area began in the late 1980s, with three out of four residences being built during the 1990s.  Most of the residences in the neighbourhood are single-family dwellings (87%), with some row houses (11%) and duplexes (2%).  Substantially all (97%) of the residences in Klarvatten are owner-occupied.

The neighbourhood's name is derived from the Swedish klar vatten, meaning "clear water".

Demographics 

Klarvatten has an average household income that is higher than the average household income for Edmonton.

Surrounding neighbourhoods

References

External links 
 Klarvatten Neighbourhood Profile

Neighbourhoods in Edmonton